Bhilwara railway station is the railway station in Bhilwara district, Rajasthan. Its code is BHL. It serves Bhilwara city. The station consists of two  platforms and two entrances. The platforms are well sheltered. It has basic amenities including Wifi in partnership with Google. It is in A category Railway Station

The station is connected to Ajmer, Jodhpur, Jaipur, Kota, Udaipur, Indore, Kolkata, Ujjain, Bhopal, Ratlam, Delhi, Bharatpur, Agra, Gwalior, Jhansi,  Lucknow, Kanpur, Allahabad, Patna, Kolkata, Vadodara, Surat, Mumbai and Hyderabad almost all big cities.

Major trains 
Some of the important trains that run from Bhilwara are:

 Ratlam–Bhilwara DMU
 Jammu Tawi–Udaipur Superfast Garib Rath Special
 Yesvantpur–Jaipur Suvidha Express
 Chetak Express
 Jaipur–Udaipur City Intercity Express
 Ananya Express
 Hyderabad–Ajmer Superfast Express 
 Bandra Terminus–Jaipur Superfast Special Fare Special
 Udaipur–Jaipur Superfast Special
 Ajmer–Bandra Superfast Express 
 Ajmer–Hyderabad Weekly Express 
 Jaipur–Nagpur Weekly Express
 Jaipur–Bhopal Express 
 Santragachi–Ajmer Weekly Express
 Ajmer–Hyderabad SpecialFare Urs Special
 Sare Jahan Se Achchha Express
 Udaipur City–New Jalpaiguri Weekly Express 
 Ongole–Ajmer SpecialFare Urs Special
 Bhagalpur–Ajmer Express
 Ratlam–Ajmer Express
 Hazur Sahib Nanded–Ajmer SpecialFare Special
 Udaipur City–Khajuraho Express
 Indore–Jaipur Express via Ajmer
 Kolkata–Ajmer Express
 Kacheguda–Ajmer SpecialFare Urs Special
 Ajmer–Machilipatnam SpecialFare Urs Link Special
 Udaipur–Ajmer Passenger

References

Railway stations in Bhilwara district
Ajmer railway division
Bhilwara